Matthew "Matt" Stephenson (1735–1808) was a British Classic winning jockey and trainer of the late 18th century.

He trained the 1789 Derby winner, Skyscraper, ridden to victory by Sam Chifney. However, he would surpass that in 1791 when, at the age of 56, he completed the near unique feat of both training and riding the Derby winner, Eager. Owned by the Duke of Bedford, Eager started at odds of 5/2 and beat the 5/4 favourite, Vermin, into second. He trained a third Derby winner in 1797 - an unnamed colt by Fidget, which was ridden by John Singleton.

He also trained a hat-trick of Oaks winners in the 1790s: Hippolyta (1790), Portia (1791) and Caelia (1793). All were Duke of Bedford horses.

Matt married John Singleton's sister, Elizabeth, and both his son and grandson became trainers. He died at Newmarket, Suffolk in 1808. His great-great-granddaughter is British biochemist, Marjory Stephenson.

Major wins (as jockey) 
 Great Britain
Epsom Derby - Eager (1791)

Major wins (as trainer) 
 Great Britain
Epsom Derby - Skyscraper (1789), Eager (1791), Colt by Fidget (1797)
Epsom Oaks - Hippolyta (1790), Portia (1791), Caelia (1793)

References 

1735 births
1808 deaths
British racehorse trainers
English jockeys